Season 2009–10 for Hibernian was their eleventh consecutive season of play in the Scottish Premier League. The SPL season began on 15 August 2009, with a 2–1 win against St Mirren at home. After a very strong start to the season in which they challenged for the league leadership, Hibs then had a slump in form in the later part of the season. The team eventually secured a Europa League place via finishing fourth in the SPL by winning 2–0 on the final day at Tannadice. Hibs were eliminated from the Scottish Cup in a quarter final replay by Ross County and were knocked out of the Scottish League Cup in the third round by St Johnstone.

Pre-season

Hibs initially confirmed seven friendly matches for pre-season, with two of those matches being billed as a "Hibernian XI". Hibs played their first match on 15 July, winning 7–0 against Selkirk. Hibs split their resources on 18 July, with a young side losing 4–2 at Berwick, while a more experienced side won 4–0 at Dunfermline. John Hughes only retained five players in the team that started against Dunfermline for the first team's next match, against Raith Rovers. Hibs were losing 1–0 when an electrical storm caused the floodlights to fail, prompting the referee David Somers to abandon the match after 46 minutes.

Hibs then underwent a short Irish tour, winning 2–0 against IFA Premiership champions Glentoran. Two days later they lost 1–0 against a Shamrock Rovers side managed by former Hibs player Michael O'Neill. Hibs also lost their only pre-season game at Easter Road, 3–1 against Preston North End on 1 August. The game was a rematch of sorts for a match played in 1887 dubbed the Championship of the World by the Football Association and the Scottish Football Association, as both clubs had won their respective national cup competitions that year.

Hibs' final two matches of pre-season saw them play out goalless draws against Blackburn Rovers on 5 August and against Bolton Wanderers, in a testimonial match for Jussi Jääskeläinen, on 8 August.

Fixtures

Scottish Premier League 
Hibs began the 2009–10 league season with a 2–1 win against St Mirren, who had Steven Thomson sent off early in the match. Although Hibs conceded the first goal due to a series of defensive errors, David Wotherspoon scored a quick equaliser on his senior debut and Abdessalam Benjelloun scored a late winner. Inconsistent form in the early part of the season saw Hibs win their first two games, lose the next two, but then win the following two league matches. These results put Hibs tied with Rangers on points for second place in the league, but manager John Hughes commented that it would be a position that Hibs would be unlikely to hold for the rest of the season. Hughes put this inconsistency down to the team's failure to work hard enough in the games they had lost.

Four points from the two following home games against Dundee United and Kilmarnock left Hibs clear in third place, just behind the Old Firm, after 8 games. Poor performances by the Old Firm, particularly in European competition, led some writers to comment that there was an opportunity for Hibs to challenge the Old Firm in a way not seen since the New Firm's success in the 1980s. John Hughes again tried to play down these expectations, stating that Hibs were "miles away" from challenging the Old Firm. Hibs continued their good start to the season with a 1–1 draw at Ibrox, and a 2–0 win against Aberdeen; former Hibs player and manager John Collins then praised the job that Hughes had done.

Continued good form, including late winning goals against Celtic and St Mirren in late January, led to Hughes challenging his players to maintain that form and secure Europa League qualification by finishing third in the SPL. Hughes targeted third even though Hibs would move above second-placed Celtic by winning a game in hand, arguing that the Old Firm were still "miles and miles in front of us". Hibs suffered heavy defeats by Rangers and St Johnstone soon afterwards, however, with Hughes admitting that he had picked the wrong team for the latter game. A defeat at Motherwell and draw with St Johnstone extended a winless run to five games, with Hibs showing "defensive frailties". A narrow win against Kilmarnock was followed by an Edinburgh derby defeat, which led Graham Stack to comment that Hibs had perhaps been "found out".

Further poor results, including a 4–1 defeat at Hamilton, led Hughes to concede that the team were "too expansive". Hibs had conceded 28 goals in a run of 13 matches that had produced only two wins. Defeats by Celtic, Rangers and Hearts meant that Hibs lost six straight matches, their worst sequence of results in 13 years. Despite this poor run, a win on the final day against Dundee United meant that Hibs finished in fourth place and qualified for the 2010–11 UEFA Europa League.

Fixtures

Final table

Scottish Cup 
Hibs entered the Scottish Cup in the fourth round, and were drawn to play junior club Irvine Meadow at home. Irvine's secretary Iain McQueen described the tie as the "biggest game in our history". Hibs were heavy favourites to progress, and did so after surviving a few scares. Hibs again received a favourable draw for the fifth round, being drawn at home to either neighbours Edinburgh City or Montrose; Montrose won the tie 3–1 against Edinburgh City to set up a "lucrative visit to Easter Road". At the date of the tie, there were 39 league places between the two clubs, with Hibs third in the SPL and Montrose bottom of the Third Division. Hibs progressed to the quarter-finals after a "resounding" 5–1 win.

Hibs were given a third consecutive home draw in the quarter-final, paired with First Division club Ross County. The tie was the first meeting of the two clubs and Ross County's first appearance in a Scottish Cup quarter-final. Hibs were "fortunate" to remain in the cup, as Ross County forced a 2–2 draw and had chances to win the tie. The result meant that there would be a replay at Victoria Park, Dingwall on 23 March. Hibs went into the replay in poor form; manager John Hughes challenged his players to handle the pressure of the situation. They were unable to do this, however, as Ross County won the replay 2–1. Hughes admitted that the team's performance over the previous month, which had also seen poor results in the SPL, had not been acceptable.

Fixtures

Scottish League Cup 
Having failed to qualify for European competition in the previous season, Hibernian entered the Scottish League Cup at the second round, and were drawn to play Brechin City, who were managed by former Hibs manager Jim Duffy. Hibs won the second round tie 3–0 on 26 August. In the third round, Hibs were again drawn to play at home, against SPL newcomers St Johnstone. Hibs beat St Johnstone 3–1 after extra time in the semi-final en route to their previous competition win in 2007. Despite winning a league match against the same opponents on the previous Saturday, Hibs lost 3–1 to exit the competition.

Fixtures

Transfers

Hibs' first significant move in the close season was to part company with manager Mixu Paatelainen, becoming the third SPL club to change manager in the space of a week. Falkirk manager John Hughes was immediately linked with the vacancy, and he was appointed Hibs manager 10 days later.

Paatelainen had already begun making changes to the squad for the new season before he left, by releasing Fabián Yantorno, Damon Gray and Andrew McNeil. Grzegorz Szamotulski's departure under free agency meant that Hughes needed to sign a new goalkeeper, which he addressed by signing Graham Stack. Paatelainen had also done much of the work leading to the signing of Danny Galbraith, which Hughes completed after he was appointed.

There were two significant departures early in the summer, with Scotland international Steven Fletcher moving to newly promoted Premier League club Burnley, and club captain Rob Jones signing for Scunthorpe United. Both buying clubs broke their transfer fee record to secure their services.

Hughes went back to his former club to sign midfielders Patrick Cregg and Kevin McBride, with Cregg being his first signing as Hibs manager. Towards the end of the window, he signed Anthony Stokes from Sunderland, with the move going against a trend of SPL players moving to English clubs. Like Cregg and McBride, Stokes had previously played under Hughes' management at Falkirk.

On the first day of the January 2010 transfer window, Hibs signed goalkeeper Graeme Smith on a free transfer. The club also loaned out youngsters Lee Currie and Sean Welsh to Stenhousemuir for a month. Towards the end of the window, Hibs signed another goalkeeper, Mark Brown, who had been released by Celtic. Hibs had tried to sign Brown in the previous window, but Celtic had been demanding a transfer fee at that time. John Hughes stated that it "looks as if" the deal to sign Brown would complete Hibs' transfer activity for the season, with the club now having a "goalkeeping school" in place. Nonetheless, late on transfer deadline day, Hibs brought in Alan Gow on loan from Plymouth. Gow had previously played for Hughes at Falkirk, forming a forward partnership with Anthony Stokes.

Players in

Players out

Loans in

Loans out

Player stats 

During the 2009–10 season, Hibs used 25 different players in competitive games. The table below shows the number of appearances and goals scored by each player. Forwards Anthony Stokes and Derek Riordan made the most appearances, only missing one game each. Stokes played in every game after he was signed, as the opening league match was played before that date.

|}

See also
List of Hibernian F.C. seasons

References

Hibernian F.C. seasons
Hibernian